Moyale Constituency is an electoral constituency in Kenya. It is one of four constituencies in Marsabit County, and it was the only constituency in the former Moyale District. The constituency has nine wards, all electing councillors to the Moyale County Council. The constituency was established for the 1966 elections.

Members of Parliament

Wards

References 

Constituencies of Marsabit County
1966 establishments in Kenya
Constituencies established in 1966